Guy's Hospital is an NHS hospital in the borough of Southwark in central London. It is part of Guy's and St Thomas' NHS Foundation Trust and one of the institutions that comprise the King's Health Partners, an academic health science centre.

It is a large teaching hospital and is, with St Thomas' Hospital and King's College Hospital, the location of King's College London GKT School of Medical Education.

The tower was overtaken as the world's tallest healthcare-related building by The Belaire in New York City in 1988. As of June 2019, the Tower Wing, which remains one of the tallest buildings in London, is the world's fifth-tallest hospital building.

History
The hospital dates from 1721, when it was founded by philanthropist Thomas Guy, who had made a fortune as a printer of Bibles and greatly increased it by speculating in the South Sea Bubble. It was originally established as a hospital to treat "incurables" discharged from St Thomas' Hospital. Guy had been a Governor and benefactor of St Thomas' and his fellow Governors supported his intention by granting the south-side of St Thomas' Street for a peppercorn rent for 999 years. Following his death in 1724, Thomas Guy was entombed at the hospital's chapel (also dating from the 18th century), in a tomb featuring a marble sculpture by John Bacon.

The original buildings formed a courtyard facing St Thomas Street, comprising the hall on the east side and the chapel, Matron's House and Surgeon's House on the west side. The original main buildings were built by the King's Master Mason, John Deval, in 1739.

A bequest of £180,000 by William Hunt in 1829, one of the largest charitable bequests in England in historic terms, allowed for a further hundred beds to be accommodated. Hunt's name was given to the southern expansion of the hospital buildings which took place in 1850. Two inner quadrangles were divided by a cloister which was later restyled and dedicated to the hospital's members who fell in the First World War. The east side comprised the care wards and the "counting house" with the governors' Burfoot Court Room. The north-side quadrangle is dominated by a statue of Lord Nuffield (1877–1963) who was the chairman of governors for many years and also a major benefactor.

In 1879-1880 the 'Guy's Hospital dispute' between matron Margaret Burt and hospital medical staff highlighted how doctors sometimes felt that their authority was being challenged by new-style matrons. Florence Nightingale advocated  that these new trained matrons had full control and discipline over their nursing staff. Margaret Burt ultimately resigned, but this was not an isolated episode and other matrons experienced similar issues, such as Eva Luckes.

In 1974, the hospital added the 34-storey Guy's Tower and 29-storey Guy's House: this complex was designed by Watkins Gray. The Wolfson Centre for Age-Related Diseases, which is dedicated to improving outcomes of conditions such as Alzheimer's disease, stroke, Parkinson's disease and spinal cord injury, was opened by the Princess Royal in December 2004.

In October 2005 children's departments moved to the Evelina London Children's Hospital in the grounds next to St Thomas's close to the Palace of Westminster. A new cancer centre, designed by Rogers Stirk Harbour + Partners, and built by Laing O'Rourke at a cost of £160 million, was completed in April 2016.

Facilities

Medical services at the Guy's site are now concentrated in the buildings to the east of Great Maze Pond: these buildings, which are connected, are known as Tower Wing, Bermondsey Wing, Southwark Wing and Borough Wing. The Cancer Centre is in a separate building just to the south. To the west of the Great Maze Pond is Guy's Campus which forms part of King's College London.

Notable people who worked or studied at Guy's

 Harold Ackroyd, First World War recipient of the Victoria Cross
 Thomas Addison, discoverer of Addison's disease
 Stephanie Amiel, diabetologist
 John Belchier, surgeon 
 William Babington, founder member of the Geological Society
 Benjamin Guy Babington invented the laryngoscope
 Richard Bright, discoverer of Bright's disease
 John Butterfield, Baron Butterfield Professor of Experimental Medicine
 Sydney Cohen, Professor of Chemical Pathology
 Sir Astley Cooper, discoverer of the Cooper's ligaments of the breasts
 Edward Cock, surgeon and nephew of Sir Astley Cooper
 Dame Rachel Crowdy, Principal Commandant of Voluntary Aid Detachments in France and Belgium from 1914 to 1919
 C. S. Forester, English novelist, studied medicine at Guy's but did not graduate
 John Frederick France, ophthalmic surgeon
 Sir Alfred Downing Fripp, surgeon who was knighted for his part in the reform of the R.A.M.C.
 Abraham Pineo Gesner, surgeon and inventor of kerosene refining
 Sir William Withey Gull, the first to describe myxoedema and coined the term anorexia nervosa
 Edward Headlam Greenhow, physician, sanitarian and  Guy's   and St  Thomas' Hospitals lecturer 
 Thomas Michael Greenhow, surgeon and sanitarian
 Georgiana Hill, cookery book writer, worked as a ward sister
 Henry Bendelack Hewetson, ophtalmic and Aural surgeon
 John Braxton Hicks, obstetrician, discoverer of the Braxton Hicks uterine contractions
 John Hilton, anatomist and surgeon 
 James Hinton, otologist
 Thomas Hodgkin, discoverer of Hodgkin's lymphoma
 Sir Frederick Hopkins, discoverer of vitamins
 James Jurin, early work on epidemiology of the smallpox vaccine
 John Keats, poet
 Thomas Wilkinson King, anatomical pathologist
 Emily MacManus, Matron
 J. F. O. Mustaffah, first Ghanaian Neurosurgeon 
 Humphry Osmond, psychiatrist who worked with psychedelic drugs and coined the term
 Frederick William Pavy, worked with Richard Bright, one of the founders and presidents of the Medical and Chirurgical Society of London
 Sir Edwin Cooper Perry Superintendent; Dean of the Medical School; 1st Warden of the Residential College
 Sir Alfred Poland, the first to describe Poland syndrome
 Philip Henry Pye-Smith, physician
 Patricia Batty Shaw, social worker
 Devi Prasad Shetty, cardiac surgeon and founder of Narayana Hrudayalaya
 Keith Simpson, Home Office Pathologist
 Jean Smellie, paediatrician
 Anthony Trafford, Baron Trafford, Conservative MP, was student and later senior registrar
 Gerard Folliott Vaughan, psychiatrist, who became a politician and minister of state during Margaret Thatcher's government
 Iain West, forensic pathologist
 Sir Samuel Wilks
 Ludwig Wittgenstein, worked anonymously as a hospital porter during World War II
 Alan Menter, International Psoriasis Council, Founder

Arms

See also 
 Francis Crick Institute
 Healthcare in London
 King's Health Partners
 List of hospitals in England
 Tall buildings in London

References

External links

 Guy's and St Thomas' NHS Foundation Trust
 Guy's & St Thomas' Foundation
 Wolfson Centre for Age Related Diseases
 Lists of Guy's Hospital students

1721 establishments in England
Brutalist architecture in London
GKT School of Medical Education
Health in the London Borough of Southwark
Hospital buildings completed in 1974
Hospitals established in the 1720s
NHS hospitals in London
Skyscrapers in the London Borough of Southwark
Teaching hospitals in London
Voluntary hospitals